Nurul Huda Mosque is one of the oldest mosques in Indonesia, located in Baringin District, Sawahlunto, West Sumatra. The mosque, built during the Dutch occupation, has a rectangular building with a tower blending into the main building. Currently, in addition to a function as a place of worship for Muslims, this two-story mosque is also used as a means of religious education for the surrounding community.

History 
There is no definitive data on when the mosque stood. However, local community estimates the mosque may be built almost simultaneously with nearby shophouses, built in 1921.

The mosque initially did not have a dome, appearing more like a church building. Therefore local people then changed the shape of the roof by attaching the dome. Although rumor has it that the building is a former church, this is not the case given the direction of mihrab in this mosque is following the direction of Qibla.

Since its establishment, this mosque was renovated once. The mosque measured 6 × 6 meters when first established, then in the 1980s, there was an overhaul for expansion of the area to 12 × 20 meters. To maintain its historical value, the renovation ensured the building is made the same as the original form, with milestones, walls, and towers preserved. The  however, is a relic of the Dutch era and non-functioning today.

References 
 Footnotes

 Bibliography

 

Buildings and structures in West Sumatra
Cultural Properties of Indonesia in West Sumatra
Mosques completed in 1921
Mosques in Indonesia
Tourist attractions in West Sumatra